Xi Orionis (ξ Orionis) is a binary star system in the northeastern part of the constellation of Orion, well above the red giant star Betelgeuse in the sky. It lies next to another blue main-sequence star, Nu Orionis, which is somewhat closer at 520 light-years' distance. The apparent visual magnitude of Xi Orionis is 4.47, which is bright enough to be seen with the naked eye. The distance to this star, as determined using the parallax method, is roughly 610 light-years.

This is a spectroscopic binary star system with an orbital period of 45.1 days and an eccentricity of 0.26. The primary component is a B-type subgiant star with a stellar classification of B3 IV. With an estimated age of just 32 million years, it has a relatively high rate of spin, showing a projected rotational velocity of 160 km/s.

References

B-type subgiants
Orion (constellation)
Orionis, Xi
Orionis, 70
042560
029426
2199
Durchmusterung objects
Spectroscopic binaries